Beautiful Joe is a 2000 American-British film written and directed by Stephen Metcalfe. It stars Sharon Stone and Billy Connolly, with supporting roles by Ian Holm, Dann Florek, and Gil Bellows.

Plot
Joe (Billy Connolly) is a regular guy who runs a flower shop in the Bronx and has never had much in the way of good luck. Things seem to be grim for Joe when he's diagnosed with a brain tumor. He's told he must have an operation soon, within the next two weeks.

Joe goes home early, catching his wife in bed with another man, and she declares she wants a divorce as he's too boring. After saying his goodbyes to his fellow Irishman father-in-law, he hops in his van, seeking adventure.

At a pawn shop, Hush (Sharon Stone), tries to get money for a ring to bet on horses. She needs to pay back a sizeable debt to her bookie. A bit of good fortune appears on Joe's horizon when he wins a 15,000 jackpot at the race track. However Hush, a stripper, sees his big payout, she tries to steal Joe's newly won fortune to pay them off. He signs over the check to nuns for charity.

Later, Joe wanders into a mud wrestling bar where Hush emcees and she convinces him to do it. While he's in the pit, Hush takes his wallet. She gives it to her bookie's henchman, and Joe is in time to scare him off. He gives her a lift home and lets him stay.

The next morning, Joe meets Hush's son and daughter Lee and Vivian, and gets some things from the supermarket to make them breakfast. When Hush gets up, she's initially hostile, but later takes him to the Geek. Joe gets his money back by explaining to the gangsters what happened, but only because they mistake him for Beautiful Joe, the syndicate kingpin they've heard about but never met.

When the gangsters discover that Joe is a florist and not a career criminal, they find the situation less than amusing. Holding Hush and the kids hostage, the Geek and his thugs leave but her ex Elton stays. Vivian goes to the bathroom. He came back, concerned about them. They lock Elton in the bathroom, and head out on the road.

Joe sleeps in his van, and the others a motel room. That night, Joe tells Hush about his   impending brain cancer surgery. The next day she leaves them in a park while she goes to Leavenworth to see Vivian's dad. That night, she shares this with Joe and tells him her real name, Alice.

On the road, they stop for horseback riding, and Joe falls down for a moment from a severe headache. That night, Joe takes Alice to dinner and dancing. There, she has altercation with a drunk, which Joe diffuses. Back at the room, they are intimate.

Reaching Vegas, Joe spends time with the kids, while Alice loses the money he gave her. Obsessed, she steals from his wallet again while they are at a show. She goes bust, and then the thugs, led by Elton, catch up to her.

Joe makes a trade, him for Alice. He sends her off with the kids, agreeing on a meeting place and time. The real beautiful Joe appears, his friend Happy. Joe discovers that his father-in-law is head of the whole syndicate.

Joe meets with the family in San Francisco, and then flies home for the operation. As the family gets in the van, Lee bursts out speaking, ashamed of his mom for her taste in men. Joe goes into the operation alone, but Alice and the kids are there to welcome him back.

Cast
 Sharon Stone as Alice "Hush" Mason
 Billy Connolly as Joe
 Gil Bellows as Elton
 Jurnee Smollett as Vivien
 Dillon Moen as Lee
 Jaimz Woolvett as "Mouse"
 Alan C. Peterson as "Howdy"
 Dann Florek as "Happy"
 Ian Holm as George "The Geek"
 Sheila Paterson as Mrs. O'Malley
 Frank C. Turner as Frank
 Gina Chiarelli as Pauline
 Ben Johnson as Gino
 Connor Widdows as Anthony
 Norman Armour as Doctor
 J.K. Simmons (uncredited)

Production
In October 1998, actress Sharon Stone stated that Beautiful Joe would be her next project, saying she had read the script while visiting her father, Joe, in a hospital. Stone said production would take place in San Francisco, where she lived. Filming instead took place in Vancouver, British Columbia, and began in June 1999. Filming in British Columbia was initially scheduled to last from June 28 to August 17. The film's budget was $15 million, and filming took place in British Columbia because of various economic incentives, which saved the production $1.5 million.

Although the film was partially set in Louisville, Kentucky, it would not feature any scenes shot there, with the possible exception of stock footage for outdoor shots. During July 1999, filming took place at Hastings Racecourse, a horse-racing track located at Vancouver's Hastings Park. For the film, the Hastings race track was transformed to portray the Churchill Downs horse track in Louisville. The scene included approximately 800 extras who cheered from the track's grandstand.

In August 1999, Stone's husband, Phil Bronstein, had a heart attack and she returned to San Francisco to be with him. Stone's departure caused production to stop for two days, and for the following three days, director Stephen Metcalfe shot scenes that did not involve her character. Stone returned to the film set a week after Bronstein's heart attack and angioplasty. Production was expected to wrap on August 19, 1999, as scheduled, or possibly a day later. Gil Bellows said about the film, "It was one of those experiences that doesn't end the way one intends. I'd rather not talk about it."

The film was produced by Fred Fuchs and Steven Haft, and financed by London-based Capitol Films. During production, Capitol Films entered an agreement with Carl Icahn's Stratosphere Entertainment, which was to distribute the film in the United States.

Release
Beautiful Joe was never released in theaters. In the United States, the film premiered on the Cinemax cable network on November 19, 2000, and was released on VHS and DVD on May 22, 2001.

Reception
The A.V. Clubs Nathan Rabin, who was critical of Stone's previous films, wrote that "nothing she's done has been quite as shameless or appalling as Beautiful Joe, a toxic piece of whimsy that ranks among the worst films of 2000." On Rotten Tomatoes, the film has an aggregated score of 60% based on 3 positive and 2 negative reviews.

References

External links

2000 films
American romantic comedy-drama films
British romantic comedy-drama films
2000 romantic comedy-drama films
American independent films
British independent films
2000 independent films
Films shot in British Columbia
2000 comedy films
2000 drama films
Films produced by Steven Haft
2000s English-language films
2000s American films
2000s British films